At least two Kurdish political parties were founded as the Revolutionary Union of Kurdistan::

 The Kurdistan Freedom Party, which operates in Iran, was founded as the Revolutionary Union of Kurdistan in 1991 and changed its name in 2006
 The Revolutionary Party of Kurdistan, which operates in Turkey, was founded as the Revolutionary Union of Kurdistan after July 1998